"So Alive" is a song by British MC Skepta and British trio, N-Dubz. It was released as an official single on 6 February 2011. It is the fourth single released Skepta's third album Doin' It Again and N-Dubz's third album Love.Live.Life. The single peaked at #99 on the UK Singles Chart.

Background
The song's radio edit lasts just under three minutes, while the album version has a longer intro and lasts nearly four minutes Skepta described the song to Digital Spy: "It's a fusion. N-Dubz are seen as a pop group and I'm more of an urban artist. Normally when those two collide the result is a big pop tune, but I wanted to do it the other way around and bring out N-Dubz's grime side. Fortunately fans of mine and N-Dubz both seem to love it!" He also explained the delay of the official single release: "I've been waiting for the right time to get it out. There was a bit of a rat race last year with so many grime artists coming out, but I feel like I've got a clear run at the moment and there's a buzz about it. Timing is everything."

Music video
The music video for "So Alive" premiered on 19 November 2010 on YouTube. At most points of the video, both Skepta and N-Dubz are all shown rapping in a ring of fire and on top of a building. The video ends with Skepta slowly jumping off the building. Dappy and Fazer are also shown in front of red illuminated gates individually during their verses. The video has over 3,500,000 views as of 22 August 2012.

Track listings

Personnel
Lead vocals – Skepta and N-Dubz
Producers – J. Adenuga
Lyrics – J. Adenuga, Contostavlos, Tulisa Contostavlos, Richard Rawson
Label: All Around the World

Chart performance

Weekly charts

Release history

References

2010 songs
2011 singles
Skepta songs
N-Dubz songs
Songs written by Tulisa (singer)
Songs written by Richard Rawson
Songs written by Dappy
All Around the World Productions singles
Songs written by Skepta
3 Beat Records singles